Mahanadi Coalfields Limited (MCL) is one of the major coal producing company of India. It is one of the eight subsidiaries of Coal India Limited. Mahanadi Coalfields Limited was carved out of South Eastern Coalfields Limited in 1992 with its headquarters at Sambalpur. It has its coal mines spread across Odisha It has total seven open cast mines and three underground mines under its fold.

MCL has two subsidiaries with private companies as a joint venture. The name of these companies are MJSJ Coal Limited & MNH Shakti Ltd.

There are 45 sanctioned mining projects in MCL with a capacity of 190.83 Mty of coal. Out of the 28 completed projects, 2 have been exhausted (Balanda OCP & Basundhara-East OCP). One Expn. Project, namely, Lajkura Expn. (2.50 Mty, 1.50 Mty incr.) is going to be approved within a short period of time.

Approval of Garjanbahal OCP (10.00 Mty) has been stalled temporarily due to delay in getting Forestry clearance. Seventeen ongoing projects i.e. Kulda OCP (10.00 Mty), Bhubaneswari OCP (20.00 Mty), Kaniha OCP (10.00 Mty), Bharatpur Expn. Ph.-III (9.00 Mty Incr.), Balaram OC Extn. (8.00 Mty), Ananta Expn. Ph.-III (3.00 Mty Incr.), Lakhanpur Expn. Ph.-III (5.00 Mty Incr.), Hingula Expn. Ph.-III (7.00 Mty Incr.), Talcher West) UG (0.52 Mty), Natraj U/G (0.64 Mty), Jagannath U/G (0.67 Mty), Bharatpur OC Expn. Ph-II (6.00 Mty Incr.), Lakhanpur Expn. (5.00 Mty Incr.), HBI UG Aug. (0.42 Mty), Basundhara (W) Expn.

References

External links
 Mahanadi Coalfields Limited, Official website

Coal companies of India
Coal India subsidiaries
Mining in Odisha
Companies based in Odisha
Energy companies established in 1992
Non-renewable resource companies established in 1992
Indian companies established in 1992
Energy in Odisha
Sambalpur
Government-owned companies of India
1992 establishments in Orissa